Minowa (written: 箕輪 or 美濃輪) is a Japanese surname. Notable people with the surname include:

 (born 1976), Japanese mixed martial artist and professional wrestler
 (born 1976), Japanese footballer
, Japanese animator
Craig Minowa, (born 1973), American musician (nee Craig Richardson)

Japanese-language surnames